Cross River (native name: Oyono) is the main river in southeastern Nigeria and gives its name to Cross River State. It originates in Cameroon, where it takes the name of the Manyu River. Although not long by African standards its catchment has high rainfall and it becomes very wide. The delta empties into a broad estuary which it shares with a few smaller rivers. The eastern side of the estuary is in the neighbouring country of Cameroon.

The major tributary of Cross river is the river Aloma coming from Benue State to merge with the Cross River in Cross River State.
Cross River State is connected with a major highway to its sister state Akwa Ibom. The Itu bridge on the Cross River is along Itu-Calabar highway and is reported to be one of the landmark achievements of the Gowon administration when it was completed in 1975.

The Cross River forms a boundary between two tropical moist forest ecoregions: the Cross-Niger transition forests, which lie west of the river between the Cross and Niger Rivers, and the Cross-Sanaga-Bioko coastal forests, which lie to the east between the Cross River and the Sanaga River of Cameroon. The average annual rainfall varies from 1,760 mm in the northern part of the state to 3,100 mm in the southern part (WSSSRP II 2016).

Cross River also gives its name to a national park and a family of languages.

The Cross River Region is of great historical importance, being a) adjacent to the likely homeland from which Bantu speaking people migrated across most of Sub-Saharan Africa 3000-5000 years ago, b) the location of where the Nsibidi Script was created, and c) the location of Calabar, one of the largest centres during the Atlantic slave trade.

References

External links
Nigerian Tourism, Cross Rivers State

Little genetic differentiation as assessed by uniparental markers in the presence of substantial language variation in peoples of the Cross River region of Nigeria

Nsibidi Script

 
Rivers of Nigeria
Cross River State
Rivers of Cameroon
ca:Riu Cross